Tillandsia argentina is a species in the genus Tillandsia. This species is native to Bolivia.

Cultivars
 Tillandsia 'Evita'

References

BSI Cultivar Registry Retrieved 11 October 2009

argentina
Flora of Bolivia